The 2014 MLB Japan All-Star Series was the eleventh edition of the MLB Japan All-Star Series, a best-of-five series between the All-Star team from Major League Baseball (MLB) and, for the first time in series history, the national team Samurai Japan. The then-new Commissioner of Nippon Professional Baseball (NPB) saw in this championship a big opportunity for their Japanese team to gain hugely useful experience for the 2017 World Baseball Classic.

The series also celebrated the 80th anniversary of the establishment of Japan's professional baseball by holding an exhibition game of a joint team of Hanshin Tigers and Yomiuri Giants against the MLB All-Stars at the Koshien Stadium on November 11, 2014.

Samurai Japan won the series by 3–2–0 and Yuki Yanagita was named MVP.

Results
Exhibition (1)

Championship

Exhibition (2)

Rosters

Live broadcasting
 Nippon Television, TBS, TV Asahi, Fuji TV (Japan)
 MLB Network (United States)

References

External links

2014 in Japanese sport
2014 in baseball
MLB Japan All-Star Series